Darker Days is the debut album by the American pop/rock band The Connells, initially released in 1985 on independent label Black Park Records in the United States, and on Demon Records in the UK. The Black Park and Demon versions are distinct, with different cover art and running order, the substitution of "In My Head" for "Dial It", and several remixed tracks. The Black Park version of the album was re-released in 1987 on TVT Records.

US track listing
All songs written by Mike Connell except "1934" by George Huntley

"Hats Off" – 4:03
"Holding Pattern" – 3:20
"Seven" – 3:12
"Unspoken Words" – 3:21
"Darker Days (version)" – 3:12
"Much Easier" – 3:49
"1934" – 2:12
"Brighter Worlds" – 2:21
"Dial It" – 1:37

UK track listing

"Darker Days" – 3:12
"Much Easier" – 3:49
"1934" – 2:12
"Brighter Worlds" – 2:21
"In My Head" – 2:51
"Hats Off" – 4:03
"Holding Pattern" – 3:20
"Seven" – 3:12
"Unspoken Words" – 3:21

Personnel 
The Connells
Doug MacMillan – vocals
Mike Connell – guitar
David Connell – bass
Peele Wimberley – drums
George Huntley – guitar, keyboards, vocals

Additional personnel
Don Dixon – producer
Dave Adams – producer
Steve Gronback – producer
Rod Dash – producer
John Rosenthal – photography
Paul Dean – design, photography
Beth Cumber – design

References

The Connells albums
1985 debut albums
Albums produced by Don Dixon (musician)